Ahmed Eyadh Ouederni is a Tunisian politician. He was the Minister-Director of the Presidential Cabinet under former President Zine El Abidine Ben Ali.

References

Government ministers of Tunisia
Living people
Date of birth missing (living people)
Year of birth missing (living people)
People from Medenine Governorate
People from Ben Gardane